Granite Hotel is a 1940 American animated short film directed by Dave Fleischer.  Released in April of that year, it was the fourth in the Stone Age Cartoons series.  The film is now in public domain.

Plot summary
Set in a modern stone-age time, the viewer is presented to a gallery of characters like a telephone operator, the ventriloquist "Edgar Burgundy" and his doll "Charlie Bacardi" (a play on Edgar Bergen and Charlie McCarthy) and a barber. A guest in need of a chess player calls the fire department who arrives riding a sauropod.

Cast
Jack Mercer

Characters
Newsboy
Hotel Clerk
Charlie Bacardi
Monkey's Uncle
Bejeweled Guest
Barbered Guest
Cold Guest
Checker Player
Bathing Guest
Telephone Operator

References

External links
 
 

1940s English-language films
1940 animated films
1940 short films
1940s American animated films
1940s animated short films
1940 comedy films
American animated comedy films
American animated short films
Fleischer Studios short films
American comedy short films
Paramount Pictures short films
Short films directed by Dave Fleischer
Animated films set in prehistory
Animated films about dinosaurs
American black-and-white films